Walton-on-the-Hill is a village in the Borough of Stafford in Staffordshire, England. It is about 5 km east of the centre of Stafford, and lies on the A513 road. The population in the 2011 census was included under the Berkswich ward.

The village amenities include several shops and Walton High School. East of Walton-on-the-Hill are Shugborough Hall (4 km) and Milford (1 km). There is a local leisure and equestrian hotspot. To the west there is a small shopping centre.

Walton-on-the-Hill forms part of the civil parish of Berkswich.

Walton-on-the-Hill also features St Thomas Church which was built in the 12th century, although it has undergone major changes during its life, mainly in the 18th century. 

Villages in Staffordshire